Asha Said Jama (born on November 15, 1960) is a Somali-Canadian social activist, and former TV reporter and journalist.

Biography
Jama was born in Merca, situated in southern Somalia. She grew up in the capital Mogadishu. There, she attended the Somali National University's Lafoole Campus and obtained a degree in journalism. Soon after graduation, Jama began working at the state-run Xidigta Oktobar newspaper. She later served as a news anchor on local television.

Due to civil unrest in Somalia, Jama decided to leave the country in the late 1980s. She moved to Canada, where she has been residing for the last twenty two years. Jama later became a community activist as President of the Calgary-based Alberta Somali Community Center. In this capacity, she has led numerous social initiatives, working closely with the Canadian Somali Congress among other organizations.

See also
Hanan Ibrahim
Hawa Abdi
Fatima Jibrell

Notes

External links
Alberta Somali Community Center

1960 births
Living people
Somalian activists
Somalian women activists
Somalian journalists
Somalian women journalists
Somalian women writers
Ethnic Somali people
Somali National University alumni

Somali-language writers